Ali Haghshenas (Persian: علی حق شناس) (born September 10, 1975) is an Iranian Writer, Historian and Journalist.

He is one of the national champions and experienced trainers of Taekwondo and freestyle martial arts, and the former coach & captain of Iran's full contact national team. 

Haqshanas has trained a large number of official trainers and referees of Martial arts in Iran.
 

Ali Haghshenas is also a founder and Chairman of Iran Taekwondo Association, the First N.G.O in Iran Sport, Iran Martial Arts Professionals Union  and leader of Iran N.G.Os Sport Society.

Books 
Lebanon Social and Political Structure, Published in 2009, Iran, Tehran.
Iran Historical Sovereignty over the Tunbs and BuMusa Islands, Published in 2010, Iran, Tehran. 
 The Diplomacy Foundations and Diplomatic Protocols, Published in 2011, Iran, Tehran.

Saudi Arabia Social and Political Structure, Published in 2015, Iran, Tehran./

 The Martial Arts Encyclopedia: The First Martial Arts Encyclopedia in Iran, Published in 2016, Iran, Tehran. 
 Comprehensive History of Iran And the Great Britain, Since the beginning (1270) Until (1812) Treaty, Published in 2018, Iran, Tehran.
 Poverty and Threats to Iran's National Security. Published in 2019, Iran, Tehran,
 The TopTaekwondo Doctrine: Taekwondo free style of the world, Published in 2020, Iran, Tehran, 
 A Patriot for All Seasons, Martyr,Dr.Seyed Hossein Fatemi. Published in 2021, Iran, Tehran,
 BBC-Anti Persian, Published in 2022, Iran, Tehran.  
 The Pathology of Martial Arts: The First Persian Source of Pathology of Martial Arts,  Published in 2022, Iran, Tehran.

 Taekwondo Physiology: The First Taekwondo Physiology Reference Book in Iran,  Published in 2022, Iran, Tehran.

Papers 
comparative reading of consensual democracy; Lebanon instance, Ettelaat newspaper. Des, 2008.
Saudi Arabia social and political structure and religious minorities. Ettelaat newspaper. Jun 2010.
United Arab Emirates Foreign Policy and Border tensions with its neighbors, Ettelaat newspaper, Aug 2010.
 Word with the readers of U.A.E Foreign Policy and Border tensions with its neighbors, Ettelaat newspaper, Sep 2010.
 Strait of Hormuz,(The Encyclopedia of Contemporary Islam).
 Persian Gulf,(The Encyclopedia of Contemporary Islam).
 review of Treaty of 1919, Between Iran & Britain.(owjnews Agency)
 Committee of Retribution. (owjnews Agency)
 movement of Jangal, resultant of Constitutional Revolution of unhappy .(owjnews Agency)

References

21st-century Iranian historians
1975 births
Writers from Tehran
21st-century Iranian politicians
Martial arts writers
Iranian male kickboxers
Iranian male karateka
21st-century Iranian lawyers
Iranian literary scholars
Iranian sports coaches
Iranian journalists
Iranian male taekwondo practitioners
Iranian sports executives and administrators
Islamic Azad University alumni
Living people